Merchants National Bank is a bank building in Winona, Minnesota, United States, designed in the Prairie School architectural style.  It was built in 1912 and features elaborate terracotta and stained-glass ornamentation.  It was listed on the National Register of Historic Places in 1974 for having state-level significance in the themes of architecture and commerce.  It was nominated for being the "largest and probably best example" of the 18 Midwestern banks designed by Purcell, Feick & Elmslie, a significant influence on early-20th-century American architecture.  It is also a contributing property to the Winona Commercial Historic District.

Description
Architects William Gray Purcell, George Feick, Jr., and George Grant Elmslie intended the building to appear solid and stable, to impress both bankers and customers.  The design elements reflected the agricultural importance of the community, with terracotta sculptures of grain on the exterior and murals of farm scenes—painted by their friend Albert Fleury—inside.  A terracotta eagle perches above the entrance.  The interior receives sunlight through stained glass window walls and a skylight, and is also lit with vertical light standards topped by round globes.  Purcell used some of these design features in the Edna S. Purcell House, built a year later.

Significance
Until the early 20th century America's civic institutions looked to European antecedents for architectural models. As a result, neoclassical columns and pediments not only predominated but also served as billboards proclaiming the security and gravitas of these establishments. The Merchants National Bank departed from this tradition by taking its inspiration from native sources—the uniquely American architecture of Louis Sullivan and the Prairie School tenets of Frank Lloyd Wright. Sullivan's 1908 National Farmers' Bank of Owatonna first demonstrated how successful the marriage of American style and banking needs could be.

The Winona bank was unusual for its time and place. In the prosperous river town where Victorian commercial blocks prevailed, the bank's cube-like geometry was arrestingly different. Botanically inspired (and decidedly nonclassical) terracotta ornamentation crept across its façades. Stained glass, generally reserved for religious structures, was used liberally in expansive windows and a sky lit ceiling, transforming daylight into a multi-hued glow.  Yet the building was also firmly rooted in the Minnesota landscape. Earthy brick and terracotta referenced the town's history of brick manufacturing. Large wall murals, depicting river scenes and the Wisconsin bluffs, spoke of the natural beauty that first lured settlers to the area. In its singularity and sense of place, the remarkable American-bred structure evoked a sense of pride among Winonans and Minnesotans alike.

See also
 National Register of Historic Places listings in Winona County, Minnesota

References

External links

1912 establishments in Minnesota
Bank buildings on the National Register of Historic Places in Minnesota
Buildings and structures in Winona, Minnesota
Commercial buildings completed in 1912
Individually listed contributing properties to historic districts on the National Register in Minnesota
National Register of Historic Places in Winona County, Minnesota
Prairie School architecture in Minnesota
Purcell and Elmslie buildings